Periscepta is a genus of moths of the family Noctuidae. The genus was described by Turner in 1920.

Species
 Periscepta butleri Swinhoe, 1892
 Periscepta polysticta Butler, 1875

References

Agaristinae